A shared zone is an implementation of a living street in Australia and New Zealand, where pedestrians, cyclists and motorised traffic share the same road space. Special rules and speed limits apply for shared zones. Shared zones are related, but not automatically the same as shared space, which is a somewhat wider concept including elements such as urban design.

Rules

For motorists and cyclists
 Motorists and cyclists must give way (yield) to pedestrians at all times throughout the entire zone, regardless of traffic signals, pedestrian crossing signals or other considerations.
 The typical speed limit of shared zones is 10 km/h (6.2 mph).

For pedestrians
 Pedestrians have right-of-way over motorists and cyclists at all times, and normal crossing rules do not apply.

Traffic signs

The sign "Start Shared Zone" indicates that the shared zone rules apply past this point.

The sign "End Shared Zone" indicates the end of the shared zone.

See also
 Speed limits in Australia

External links
 Driving in Victoria: Rules & Responsibilities
 Pedestrian Council of Australia: Shared Zones
 Shared Zones Fact Sheet

Living streets
Transport in Victoria (Australia)
Types of streets
Types of roads